Abimelech was the Philistine king met by Abraham in the Book of Genesis, one of many Philistine kings by that name.

Abimelech may also refer to:
Abimelech (Judges), son of Gideon and King of Israel in the Book of Judges
Abimelech (oratorio), an oratorio first performed in 1768 and describing events in the Book of Genesis

See also
Achimelech
Avimelekh, Russian male first name